"Uprock" is a song by American hip hop group the Rock Steady Crew from their debut studio album Ready For Battle. It was released in 1984 through Charisma/Virgin Records as the album's second single. Written by Budd "Blue Soldier" Dixon, Ruza Blue and Stephen Hague, and produced by Dixon and Hague, the song refers to uprock style of dance. The single made it to the top ten in Australia and found minor success on German and UK charts, reaching peak positions #27 and #64 respectively.

Video
The music video is filmed in New York City and consists of different scenes of Baby Love, Buck 4, Crazy Legs, Devious Doze, Kuriaki and Prince Ken Swift breaking in different New York environments.

Track listing

Charts

Weekly charts

Year-end charts

References

External links 

1984 singles
Songs about dancing
Virgin Records singles
Songs written by Stephen Hague
Song recordings produced by Stephen Hague